Good Morning President is a 2009 South Korean film written and directed by Jang Jin that takes viewers to the private quarters of the Blue House during the terms of three fictional presidents (played by Lee Soon-jae, Jang Dong-gun and Go Doo-shim), each trapped between political and ethical choices. It was chosen as the opening film of the 14th Busan International Film Festival and was released in theaters on October 22, 2009.

Plot
The first president depicted in the movie is Kim Jeong-ho, an elderly president at the end of his term. He is a respected leader whose great legacy is bringing democracy to the nation and serving the working class throughout his political life. But Kim is at a moral crossroads when he becomes the unlikely winner of a  lottery jackpot just before retiring. The huge amount of money would guarantee a comfortable life in his old age. However, he remembers announcing to his constituents, smiling before cameras, that if he were to win the lottery, he would donate it to charity. He agonizes in silence, wondering whether to keep it for himself or to make good on his words.

Kim’s successor is Cha Ji-wook, the youngest Korean president in history who demonstrates excellent diplomatic skills in handling foreign policies. But even this charismatic president, who is a widowed single father, has three major fears — getting injections, questions from his five-year-old son, and candlelight rallies. One day, a young man asks the president to donate one of his rare tissue-type kidneys, which he says can save his father's life. The president struggles to decide whether or not he should go through a fearful medical procedure. He also reconnects with a childhood crush.

Last but not least, there is Han Gyeong-ja, the country's first female president who is constantly at odds with her troublemaking husband. She finds it more difficult to resolve personal problems related to her reckless husband than to manage state affairs. Entangled in a big corruption scandal involving her husband's real estate speculation, she is offered a divorce to save her presidency. She is now forced to choose between her family and her country.

Cast

Jang Dong-gun as Cha Ji Wook
Lee Soon-jae as Kim Jeong Ho 
Go Doo-shim as Han Gyeong Ja 
Han Chae-young as Kim Yi Yeon 
Im Ha-ryong as Choi Chang Myeon
Lee Moon-soo as Blue House executive chef
Park Hae-il as man requesting a transplant
Lee Hae-yeong as head secretary Moon Young Chul 
Joo Jin Mo as chief of Secret Service
Jung Gyu-soo as Kim Jeong-ho's chief of staff 
Jeon Yang-ja as Kim Jeong-ho's wife 
Jang Young-nam as Cha Ji Wook's staff adviser 
Park Jun-se as Chang-myeon's attache
Jeon Gook-hwan as Congressman 1 
Lee Han-wi as Congressman 2 
Jo Deok-hyeon as Congressman Choi 
Lee Yong-yi as old mom 
Choi Ji-na as waltz teacher 
Kim Il-woong 
Lee Cheol-min 
Gong Hyung-jin as motorcycle delivery man 
Seung Hyo-bin as Kyeong-Ja's secretary	
Ryu Seung-ryong as North Korean emissary 
Chae Byeong-chan as male college student 
Jung Yu Mi as Mimi
Song Young-kyu as Cha Ji-wook's doctor 
Kong Ho-suk as Gyeong-ja's advisor 
Kim Won-hae as Gyeong-ja's advisor 2

Background
Only a few decades ago, the president was an off-limits subject in Korean cinema. It was almost impossible for the older generation who lived through military dictatorships to parody their president. Times have changed, however, and the head of state has been an interesting and appealing character to portray in Korean movies and dramas in recent years. Good Morning, President is a film that brings to light the human side of the nation’s top leader.
The political comedy is directed by Jang Jin, well known for using a unique sense of humor to add spice to a plot, poking fun at politics, and providing some good laughs. On top of good humor and laughter, the movie presents the director's ideal vision of how Korean presidents should be. The three presidents depicted in the movie are charismatic, moral and unselfish, although they agonize over their choices between public interest and personal happiness. The director, who also wrote the script, said it was free of political ideology and instead was a "fun movie everyone can enjoy."

Awards and nominations

References

External links
  
 
 
 

−

2009 films
South Korean black comedy films
Films directed by Jang Jin
Films about presidents
2009 black comedy films
2000s South Korean films
2000s Korean-language films